KGBeast (Anatoli Knyazev) is a supervillain appearing in comic books published by DC Comics. Created by Jim Starlin and Jim Aparo, the character first appeared as an adversary of Batman.

KGBeast has appeared in numerous series and films. Anatoli appeared in his first live adaptation as a recurring cast member on The CW Arrowverse television series Arrow played by David Nykl. Anatoli also appeared as a secondary antagonist and a henchman for Lex Luthor in the DC Extended Universe film Batman v Superman: Dawn of Justice played by Callan Mulvey.

Publication history
KGBeast first appeared in (March 1988) and was created by Jim Starlin and Jim Aparo.

Fictional character biography

Backstory
Anatoli Knyazev, code-named "The Beast", and known to the C.I.A. as the "KGBeast" is trained as an assassin by "The Hammer", a top secret cell of the KGB. In addition to being the master of several martial arts, his strength is cybernetically enhanced, and he also masters the use of every known deadly weapon. At the time of his first appearance, he is rumored to have killed at least 200 people.

First appearance
The Beast made his first appearance in the storyline, "Ten Nights of The Beast" Batman #417 (March 1988), which was later reprinted as a trade paperback of the same name. It was written by Jim Starlin and drawn by Jim Aparo and Mike DeCarlo.
 
The Hammer's general, angry that the Soviet government is working to better relations with the United States, sends Knyazev on a mission to kill 10 high-ranking U.S. officials in an attempt to cripple the Strategic Defense Initiative program. These include scientists, civilian administrators, military figures, and politicians, the last of whom being then-U.S. President Ronald Reagan, scheduled to visit Gotham City.

Despite Batman's best efforts, the Beast eliminates nearly all of his targets. In particular, he showcases his ruthlessness by poisoning an entire banquet, killing over 100 people, just to ensure that his target dies.

When Batman finally faces the Beast in hand-to-hand combat, the Beast quickly gains the upper hand, at the time, proves himself better than Batman in both tactical planning and engagement. However, failing to realize that he had advantages over Batman in abilities, the Beast flees because he thinks Batman has contingencies based on the hero's reputation, loses his opportunity to kill Batman as the Dark Knight later improved his skills since then.

During the rematch between the two, Batman snares the Beast's left wrist with the Batrope. Rather than be captured, the Beast grabs a nearby axe and chops off the restrained hand. The Beast quickly has the limb replaced with a cybernetic gun, made by one of Gotham's top weapons dealers.

Before the final confrontation between Batman and the Beast, C.I.A. Agent Ralph Bundy reminds Batman that, if the Beast is captured alive, he will have to be handed over to the Soviets, and likely escape justice. Knowing this, Batman, after thwarting the Beast's assassination attempt on Reagan, destroys the Beast's gun-arm, lures him into the sewers, and then corners him in an underground room. The Beast invites Batman to fight him to the death, but instead Batman locks the room, effectively burying the assassin alive.

In the later story, Batman: Year Three, Batman notes that he then contacted the police to pick up the subdued villain.

Later appearances
However, the Beast escapes and goes into hiding, from where he sees the Soviet Union dissolve. His protégé, the NKVDemon, surfaces in Russia, but is killed by Batman's ally, Soviet police detective Nikita Krakov. The Beast becomes a traditional supervillain, engaging in a counterfeiting scheme and having additional cybernetic implants inserted into his body. He fights Robin and the Huntress, but is ultimately defeated by King Snake. He later acquires a small nuclear bomb that he uses to threaten Gotham City. He is defeated by Robin and ultimately locked up in Blackgate Penitentiary.

In the No Man's Land storyline, the Beast appears as a henchman of Lock-Up, during the latter's tenure as the unofficial warden of Blackgate.

One Year Later
One year after the events of Infinite Crisis, the Beast is thrown from a roof by a man thought to be Two-Face, after the Beast botches an assassination. His lifeless body is later found by the police, his death caused by two gunshots to the head. Two-Face appears to be innocent of the murder; the killer seems to be the Tally Man, hired by the Great White Shark. The Beast's body is later stolen by a mysterious group who are reanimating corpses and turning them into zombie-like soldiers. His head is shown floating in a tank with several life support devices, indicating that he will return at some point in the future.

Blackest Night
As part of the Blackest Night story arc, KGBeast's corpse is reanimated by a black power ring and recruited to the Black Lantern Corps during the Blackest Night: Batman miniseries. He uses his ring to form a black energy construct of his gun arm.

Post-Flashpoint 
As part of the New 52, the character gets a new backstory on the New Suicide Squad #2 (October 2014). KGBeast/Commander Anatoli Knyazev is a citizen of the USSR until it dissolves. He is trained by Boris Ulyanov/Hammer, as well as others like Kanto, and masters several forms of martial arts. In addition, he gains cybernetic abilities which increase his strength. He fights against the Suicide Squad as a Russian military soldier. After losing many times, he becomes a member of Suicide Squad.

DC Rebirth
In DC Rebirth KGBeast is now simply The Beast. He is described as one of the world's best contract killers, who formerly worked for the U.S. government and typically is exclusive to Washington D.C. His logo is a 666 symbol. He has his own private island constructed for the purposes of taking his captured enemies there and engaging them in a hunt to the death, free from any national jurisdictions. He is hired by the Penguin, Black Mask, and Great White to kill Batman and Two-Face after the latter threatens to release his collection of blackmail data to the world. Anatoli is last seen when, to stop him killing a group of rioting civilians, Batman lunges into him and over a cliff. Only Batman is saved by Duke Thomas, leaving Beast's fate uncertain.

He is hired by Bane to break Batman by assassinating his protege Nightwing. He is cornered by Batman after he murdered his father at the cabin. He's been hit in the neck, and Batman decides to walk away, leaving his fate unknown once again. It is later revealed that KGBeast was saved by government agents who had been watching their fight from a distance.

Other versions

Flashpoint
In the alternate timeline of the Flashpoint event, KGBeast is imprisoned in military Doom prison. During the prison break, KGBeast is shot with a blast by corrections officer Amazo.

In other media

Television
 KGBeast makes non-speaking appearances in Justice League Unlimited. This version is a member of Gorilla Grodd's Secret Society. Prior to and during the episode "Alive!", Lex Luthor takes control of the Secret Society, but Grodd mounts a mutiny. KGBeast initially sides with the latter before defecting to the former, only to be killed by Darkseid along with most of the Society.
 Anatoly Knyazev appears in Arrow, portrayed by David Nykl. Introduced in season two, he met Oliver Queen on the island of Lian Yu and received the latter's help in escaping from Dr. Anthony Ivo. Queen later sought out Knyazev's help in joining the Bratva to kill Russian gangster Kovar. In the present, Queen occasionally seeks out Knyazev's aid in fighting Star City's crime. In season six, Knyazev joins Cayden James's cabal and fights against Queen until Ricardo Diaz usurps James in the season six finale, leading to Knyazev abandoning Diaz for fighting without honor. Following this, Knyazev becomes Queen's ally again, as well as an informant for A.R.G.U.S. In season seven, Diaz seeks revenge on Knyazev for betraying him and slaughters his Bratva unit. While Queen and his team save Knyazev, he leaves Star City not long after. In the season eight episode, "Prochnost", Knyazev returns to Russia following Diaz's death and opens a bar. He later helps Queen, Laurel Lance, and Mia Smoak procure a weapon that could be used on the Monitor while tangling with a separate faction of the Bratva. Knyazev makes his last appearance in the series finale, "Fadeout", as a guest at Queen's funeral after the latter gave his life to avert the Crisis.
 KGBeast appears in Harley Quinn, voiced by Matt Oberg.

Film
 KGBeast makes a brief appearance in Batman: Assault on Arkham, voiced by Nolan North. He is recruited into Amanda Waller's Suicide Squad, but believes she is bluffing when she says she implanted bombs in the recruits' necks to keep them in line. When he attempts to leave, Waller detonates KGBeast's bomb, killing him as a warning to the remaining squad members.
 Anatoly Knyazev appears in Batman v Superman: Dawn of Justice, portrayed by Callan Mulvey. This version is a mercenary, terrorist, and weapons trafficker who secretly works for Lex Luthor. While conducting business with African terrorists, Knyazev betrays them and kills his men before Superman arrives, though Knyazev escapes. While delivering Kryptonite to Luthor, Batman pursues Knyazev, but Superman stops the Dark Knight, allowing Knyazev to complete his job. On Luthor's orders, Knyazev kidnaps Martha Kent and Lois Lane, but Batman rescues the former and Superman the latter.

Video games
KGBeast appears as an NPC in the NES version of Batman: The Video Game. This version is a ninja who wields a sword and shuriken.

See also
 List of Batman family enemies

References

External links
 KGBeast at DC Comics Wiki
 KGBeast at Comic Vine

Fictional henchmen
DC Comics male supervillains
DC Comics characters with superhuman strength
Fictional amputees
Fictional assassins in comics
DC Comics cyborgs
Fictional gunfighters in comics
Fictional super soldiers
Comics characters introduced in 1988
DC Comics martial artists
Fictional KGB agents
Characters created by Jim Starlin
Characters created by Jim Aparo
Cold War in popular culture
Male film villains
Action film villains
Fictional murdered people
Suicide Squad members